Steve Alan Prindiville (born 26 December 1968) is an English former professional footballer who played in the Football League for Chesterfield, Doncaster Rovers, Leicester City and Mansfield Town.

References

1968 births
Living people
English footballers
Association football defenders
English Football League players
Leicester City F.C. players
Chesterfield F.C. players
East Bengal Club players
Hinckley Athletic F.C. players
Mansfield Town F.C. players
Leicester United F.C. players
Doncaster Rovers F.C. players
Wycombe Wanderers F.C. players
Halifax Town A.F.C. players
Dagenham & Redbridge F.C. players
Kidderminster Harriers F.C. players
Nuneaton Borough F.C. players
Stafford Rangers F.C. players